Don Beck (born June 2, 1953) is an American professional basketball coach.

Career 
Beck began his career on the sideline as assistant coach at Santa Barbara City College in 1978. Other assistant coach stints came at Bentley College, Rutgers University and Fresno State University before taking his first head coach position at Santa Barbara City College in 1989, where he coached the women's team.

In 1990, Beck accepted the interim head coaching position at Fresno State and in 1992 was named head coach of Sunair Oostende, a first-division team from Belgium.

During his seven-year tenure at German Basketball Bundesliga side TVG Trier (1994–2001), Beck guided the team to two German Cup titles (1998 and 2001) and a trip to the Bundesliga semifinals in 1998. In 2001, Beck took the reins at fellow Bundesliga team EWE Baskets Oldenburg, where he worked until May 2007. He was then named head coach of Euphony Bree of Belgium until January 2009 and served as head coach of the Eiffel Towers Den Bosch, a member of the Dutch top-flight Eredivisie, from January 2009 to April 2010.

From 2010 to 2015, Beck was at the helm of Japanese side Toyota Alvark. He received JBL Coach of the Year honors in the 2011–12 season after guiding the team to a championship title and led Alvark to a second-place finish in 2014–15. He served as head coach of the Toyota Antelopes in the Women's Japan Basketball League from 2015 to 2018 and then accepted the head coaching job with the Toyama Grouses of Japan's B.League in July 2018. He coached the Toyoma team until 2020. In May 2021, he was named head coach of the Kumamoto Volters of Japan's B2 league.

Head coaching record

|-
| style="text-align:left;"|Toyota Alvark
| style="text-align:left;"|2010–11
|36||23||13|||| style="text-align:center;"|3rd in JBL|||-||-||-||
| style="text-align:center;"|-
|-
|- style="background:#FDE910;"
| style="text-align:left;"|Toyota Alvark
| style="text-align:left;"|2011–12
|42||29||13|||| style="text-align:center;"|2nd in JBL|||6||5||1||
| style="text-align:center;"|JBL champions
|-
| style="text-align:left;"|Toyota Alvark
| style="text-align:left;"|2012–13
|42||32||10|||| style="text-align:center;"|2nd in JBL|||3||1||2||
| style="text-align:center;"|3rd place
|-
| style="text-align:left;"|Toyota Alvark
| style="text-align:left;"|2013–14
|54||45||9|||| style="text-align:center;"|2nd in NBL-E|||5||2||3||
| style="text-align:center;"|3rd place
|-
| style="text-align:left;"|Toyota Alvark
| style="text-align:left;"|2014–15
|54||40||14|||| style="text-align:center;"|3rd in NBL-E|||9||5||4||
| style="text-align:center;"|Runners-up in NBL
|-
| style="text-align:left;"|Toyama Grouses
| style="text-align:left;"|2018–19
|60||32||28|||| style="text-align:center;"| 3rd in Central|||2||0||2||
| style="text-align:center;"|Lost in 1st round
|-
| style="text-align:left;"|Toyama Grouses
| style="text-align:left;"|2019–20
|41||17||24|||| style="text-align:center;"| 3rd in Central|||-||-||-||
| style="text-align:center;"|-
|-

References

External links 
 Eurobasket profile
 Bundesliga profile

1953 births
Living people
Basketball coaches from New York (state)
Alvark Tokyo coaches
American expatriate basketball people in Belgium
American expatriate basketball people in Germany
American expatriate basketball people in Japan
American expatriate basketball people in the Netherlands
Fresno State Bulldogs men's basketball coaches
Junior college men's basketball coaches in the United States
Rutgers Scarlet Knights men's basketball coaches
Sportspeople from New York City
Toyama Grouses coaches
American men's basketball players
Heroes Den Bosch coaches
Baskets Oldenburg coaches
BC Oostende coaches